In linear algebra and ring theory, the Howell normal form is a generalization of the row echelon form of a matrix over , the ring of integers modulo N. The row spans of two matrices agree if, and only if, their Howell normal forms agree.

Definition 

Then the topmost  rows of the matrix are non-zero,
 For , let  be the index of the leftmost non-zero element in the row . Then .

With elementary transforms, each matrix in the row echelon form can be reduced in a way that the following properties will hold:

 For each  it holds that .

If  adheres to both above properties, it is said to be in reduced row echelon form.

If  adheres to the following additional property, it is said to be in Howell normal form ( denotes the row span of ):

Then , where  is the matrix obtained of rows from -th to -th of the matrix .

Properties 
The matrix  can be obtained from matrix  via a sequence of elementary transforms. 

For example, the matrices

 

have the same Howell normal form over :

 

However,  is not a field and over general rings it is sometimes possible to nullify a row's pivot by multiplying the row with a scalar without nullifying the whole row. In this particular case, 
 
It implies ,  which wouldn't be true over any field or over integers.

References

Bibliography 
 
 
 

Matrix normal forms